World Buddhist Council may refer to:
 Buddhist councils, History of Buddhist Councils
 World Buddhist Sangha Council, Ecumenic Organization

See also
 World Council (disambiguation)